Anwar Uddin Shikdar is a Bangladesh Nationalist Party politician and the former Member of Parliament of Dhaka-4.

Career
Shikdar was elected to parliament from Dhaka-4 as a Bangladesh Nationalist Party candidate in 1979.

References

Bangladesh Nationalist Party politicians
Living people
2nd Jatiya Sangsad members
Year of birth missing (living people)